Mamta Sharma is an Indian playback singer. She is known for the song "Munni Badnaam Hui" from Dabangg. The song was a chartbuster and fetched her several awards and nominations, including a Filmfare award for Best Playback Singer (Female). She also sings in Kannada, Telugu, Tamil, Bengali, Marathi and Bhojpuri.

Hindi film songs

2008

2010

2011

2012

2013

2014

2015

2016

2017

2018

2019

2020

2021

2022

Songs in other languages

Kannada songs

Marathi songs

Tamil songs

Telugu songs

Bengali songs

Haryanvi songs

Non-film songs

References

Lists of songs recorded by Indian singers